Lyle is a surname of Scottish origin which means "an island". It can be traced back to Radulphus de Insula, 11th-century Lord of Duchal Castle. Notable people with the surname include:

 Aaron Lyle (1759–1825), member of the US House of Representatives from Pennsylvania
 Abram Lyle (1820–1891), sugar refiner
 Adrienne Lyle (born 1985), US Olympic equestrian
 Alexander Gordon Lyle (1889–1955), US Navy dentist and Medal of Honor awardee
 Amalya Lyle Kearse (born 1937), US judge
 Amos Lyle (1866–1943), politician of Manitoba, Canada
 Bobby Lyle (born 1944), jazz pianist
 Brayden Lyle (born 1973), Australian rules footballer
 Dan Lyle (born 1970), American rugby union footballer
 Derek Lyle (born 1981), footballer with Hamilton Accies in the Scottish Premier League
 Ethel Hedgeman Lyle (1887–1950), founder of Alpha Kappa Alpha Sorority at Howard University
 Freddrenna Lyle, alderman of the 6th ward, in Chicago
 Graham Lyle (born 1944), Scottish singer-songwriter and guitarist of Gallagher and Lyle
 George B. Lyle, briefly mayor of Atlanta
 George Lyle (ice hockey) (born 1953), professional hockey player
 Jarrod Lyle (1981–2018), Australian professional golfer
 John E. Lyle Jr. (1910–2003), US representative from Texas
 John M. Lyle (1872–1945), Canadian architect
 Keith Lyle (born 1972), safety in the National Football League
 Lauren Lyle (born 1993), Scottish actress
 Maria Lyle (born 2000), Scottish sprinter
 Nancy Lyle (1910–1986), UM tennis player
 Pablo Lyle (born 1986), Mexican telenovela actor
 Rick Lyle (born 1971), American football defensive end
 Robert Lyle (Minnesota politician), American politician
 Ron Lyle (1941–2011), professional boxer
 Rudy Lyle (1930–1985), American bluegrass banjo player
 Roberto Lyle Fritch (born 1956), Famous business entrepreneur in Mexico 
 Sandy Lyle (born 1958), Scottish professional golfer
 Sparky Lyle (born 1944), American left-handed relief pitcher in Major League Baseball
 Stevie Lyle (born 1979), British professional ice hockey goaltender
 Thomas Ranken Lyle (1860–1944), physicist, radiologist, educator and rugby player in Australia
 Tom Lyle (1953–2019), comic book artist and penciller
 William Lyle (1871–1949), medical doctor and politician from Northern Ireland
 Willie Lyle (born 1984), Scottish professional footballer

See also
Lyle (disambiguation)
Lyell (disambiguation)

References

Surnames of Scottish origin